Podocarpus ledermannii is a species of conifer in the family Podocarpaceae. It is found on New Guinea and the Bismarck Archipelago in Indonesia and Papua New Guinea.

Podocarpus ledermannii is found in lowland and montane rain forests, from near sea level up to 2,300 meters elevation. It has been found in the Purari and Sepik river delta forests, and in lower montane forests dominated by species of Castanopsis. It typically grows as a scattered tree, but can be locally dominant. It is an understorey tree in high-canopied forests, and can be a canopy tree in lower-canopied forests.

References

ledermannii
Least concern plants
Flora of New Guinea
Flora of the Bismarck Archipelago
Taxonomy articles created by Polbot